Jorge Osvaldo Schwager Navarrete (born 4 July 1983) is a retired Chilean footballer.

Coaching career
After retiring, Schwager began coaching, starting his new experience in July 2016, when he was appointed assistant coach of Pablo Guede at Colo-Colo. From 2018, Schwager also functioned as a youth coach at Colo.

In January 2019, Schwager was appointed assistant coach of Francisco Bozán at Universidad de Concepción They left the club at the end of 2019.

On 3 February 2020, Schwager signed as an assistant coach for Deportes Recoleta under the management of his former teammate, Felipe Núñez.

References

External links
Jorge Schwager at Football Lineups
BDFA Profile

1983 births
Living people
People from Osorno, Chile
Chilean people of German descent
Chilean footballers
Association football defenders
Universidad de Concepción footballers
Puerto Montt footballers
Deportes La Serena footballers
Provincial Osorno footballers
Chilean Primera División players